Metrioidea varicornis is a species of skeletonizing leaf beetle in the family Chrysomelidae. It is found in Central America and North America.

References

Further reading

 
 

Galerucinae
Articles created by Qbugbot
Beetles described in 1868
Taxa named by John Lawrence LeConte